This is a list of Croatian television related events from 2002.

Events
10 March - Vesna Pisarović is selected to represent Croatia at the 2002 Eurovision Song Contest with her song "Sasvim sigurna". She is selected to be the tenth Croatian Eurovision entry during Dora held at the Zagreb Fair in Zagreb.

Debuts

Television shows

Ending this year

Births

Deaths